Rafael García Casanova (born 6 January 1989) is an Uruguayan professional footballer who plays as a centre-back for Cerro Largo.

Honours
Nacional

Uruguayan Primera División (1): 2011–12

References

External links

1989 births
Living people
Footballers from Montevideo
Uruguayan footballers
Uruguayan expatriate footballers
Expatriate footballers in Mexico
Expatriate footballers in Argentina
Uruguayan expatriate sportspeople in Mexico
Uruguayan expatriate sportspeople in Argentina
Association football midfielders
Association football central defenders
Cerro Largo F.C. players
Club Nacional de Football players
Rampla Juniors players
Centro Atlético Fénix players
Atlético Morelia players
Defensa y Justicia footballers
Atlético Tucumán footballers
Club Atlético Colón footballers
Liga MX players
Uruguayan Primera División players
Argentine Primera División players